Masahiro Kobayashi is the name of:

 Masahiro Kobayashi (director) (1954–2022), Japanese film director
 Masahiro Kobayashi (actor) (born 1971), Japanese actor and voice actor

See also 
 Kobayashi